Mauá Shipyard SA is the oldest private Brazilian shipyard, being surpassed only by the state-owned Arsenal da Marinha do Brasil, which was founded in 1808. Its origin is the Anglo-Brazilian company Estabelecimento de Fundição e Estaleiros da Ponta d'Areia, located in Niterói, Rio de Janeiro, and was bought on August 11, 1846, by Irineu Evangelista de Sousa, at the time Baron of Mauá.

In 2000, the company entered into a joint-venture with Jurong Shipyard in Singapore, creating the company Mauá Jurong S/A (MJ). The new company, in addition to the construction and repair of ships, specializes in the construction of platforms for oil and gas exploration.

The shipyard remains in operation, even with the crisis installed in Brazil.

Recent vessel production
A not extensive list of Mauá's production:

See also 
 List of ships of the Brazilian Navy 
 Arsenal de Marinha do Rio de Janeiro
 Ishikawajima do Brasil Estaleiros

Further reading

References

External links 
 Official site

Companies based in Rio de Janeiro (state)
Manufacturing companies of Brazil
Engineering companies of Brazil
Manufacturing companies established in 1845
Military history of Brazil
Shipbuilding companies of Brazil
1845 establishments in Brazil